A protein mimetic is a molecule such as a peptide, a modified peptide or any other molecule that biologically mimics the action or activity of some other protein. 
Protein mimetics are commonly used in drug design and discovery.

Types of mimetics
There are a number of different distinct classes of protein mimetics.
Antibody mimetic - Molecules that mimic antigen binding activity of antibodies
Peptidomimetic - Small protein-like chains designed to mimic larger peptide.
Phosphomimetics -  An amino acid substitution or modification which mimic the effect of protein phosphorylation.

See also
Homology (biology)

Drug discovery
Drugs blocking protein-protein interactions
Proteins
Molecular biology